The Carmine String Quartet (Carmine Vonósnégyes) was founded by Varga Veronika, joined by another three Hungarian women. After one personnel change the members are

Véber Judit (first violin)
Varga Veronika (second violin)
Kis Veronika (viola)
Czékmány Szilvia (cello)

External links
Carmine String Quartet webportal
Videoclips from one performance
Varga Veronika works

Carmine Quartet

da:Strygekvartet
de:Streichquartett
it:Quartetto di violini
hu:Vonósnégyes
nl:Strijkkwartet
ja:弦楽四重奏